Dragan Espenschied (born 1975) is an 8-bit musician and media artist who lives and works in New York City. He studied communication design at the Merz Academy in Stuttgart, Germany. Dragan started to develop software for Atari Computers in 1991.

In 1995 he founded the 8-bit band "Bodenständig 2000" together with Bernhard Kirsch. They got signed on the label Rephlex in London, and started touring throughout Europe and the USA.  Together with media activist Alvar Freude he worked on projects like Freedom Phone, Omni-Cleaner, Assoziations-Blaster and insert_coin.

In 2003 he started working with the net.art pioneer Olia Lialina. Their most famous works are Zombie and Mummy, Online Newspapers, Frozen Niki, With Elements Of Web 2.0 and Midnight.

Since 2014, he is leading the Digital Art Conservation Program at Rhizome.

External links
 Dragan Espenschied Life And Times, weblog
 Assoziations-Blaster
 Wired interview about 8-bit music, 2007
 Bodenständig 2000
 Contemporary Home Computing
 Hupel Pupel Magazin

References

German male musicians
German artists
1975 births
Living people